The Wassi Kussa River is a river in southwestern Papua New Guinea.

See also
List of rivers of Papua New Guinea
Upper Wassi Kussa languages

References

Rivers of Papua New Guinea